Normand M. Bazin (born January 18, 1971) is the current head coach of the University of Massachusetts Lowell River Hawks men's ice hockey team.  In 2013 he led the team to their first Hockey East Championship and their first appearance in the Frozen Four.

Career
Bazin played left wing for the University of Massachusetts Lowell from 1990 (as the University of Lowell) until he graduated in 1994, where he played alongside future NHL goaltender Dwayne Roloson.  He played one season with the ECHL Birmingham Bulls, before returning to Lowell to serve as an assistant coach under Tim Whitehead.  After three years in Lowell he moved to an assistant position at Colorado College. During his tenure the Tigers won their regular season three times, made six appearances in the NCAA tournament and progressed to the Frozen Four in 2005.  The team had a combined record of 205–103–22 between 2000 and 2008 with Bazin as assistant coach.

In 2008 he left the school to accept a head coaching position at Hamilton College in New York, where he coached the team to a regular season conference championship in 2011.  That year Bazin was hired as head coach at UMass Lowell when Blaise MacDonald was fired at the end of a 5–24–4 season (a program low for Lowell since it entered Division I in 1984).  Under Bazin's guidance, the River Hawks made two consecutive appearances in the NCAA Division I Ice Hockey Tournament, and won both the Hockey East regular season and the league tournament in 2013 (both program firsts).

Car Accident
In 2003 Bazin, then an assistant coach at Colorado College, was driving on U.S. Route 395 during a recruiting trip when his car was struck by a drunk driver.  Rescuers needed over an hour to free Bazin from the wreckage, and he was rushed to Deaconess Medical Center in Spokane, with severe injuries that included a severed aorta.  Bazin was given a 10% chance of survival, and was so close to death when he first arrived that a priest performed last rites.  After 12 hours of surgery and 8 days in a medically induced coma, Bazin awoke but lingering injuries included a broken jaw, arms, shoulders, ribs, pelvis and legs, as well as bruising to his lungs and spleen.

After months of physical therapy confined to a wheelchair, Bazin fully recovered with no lasting health effects "worth mentioning".  The story of his injury, recovery and subsequent success as head coach at his alma mater has been covered by several media outlets, including The Globe and Mail, which quoted the coach as saying that since the accident “I never have a bad day”.
Bazin's second son Coleston is named for Dr. Daniel Coulston, the critical care physician who Bazin credits with saving his life.

Head coaching record

References

External links
 Official biography, UMass Lowell River Hawks

1971 births
Living people
American ice hockey coaches
Buffalo Stampede players
Colorado College Tigers men's ice hockey coaches
UMass Lowell River Hawks men's ice hockey coaches
UMass Lowell River Hawks men's ice hockey players
Ice hockey people from Manitoba
People from Central Plains Region, Manitoba